Meera is a 1979 Hindi language film by Gulzar. The film is based on the life of Meera, a Hindu saint-poet who renounced princely comforts in pursuit of her love for Lord Krishna. The film portrays the life and times of Meera from a historical perspective rather than a mythological one. The soundtrack by Pt. Ravi Shankar features the award-winning playback singer Vani Jairam.

The film did not perform well at the Indian box office, although it received critical acclaim.

Plot
The story is set around 1480, in the time of King Akbar. Biramdev (Dr Shreeram Lagoo) is the king of Medta, a province in Rajasthan. He has two daughters, Meera (Hema Malini) and Krishna (Vidya Sinha) and a son, Jaimal (Dinesh Thakur). Meera is in deep emotional love with Lord Krishna, so much so that she considers Lord Krishna to be her husband. Akbar (Amjad Khan) is becoming stronger day by day and hence other small provinces are trying to join against him. Medta, in one such political agreement, decides to join hands with Raja Vikramajit (Shammi Kapoor). As a part of this agreement Meera is married (against her wish) to Vikramajit's son, Rana Bhojraj (Vinod Khanna). But even after getting married her love for Lord Krishna remains the same and she follows her own ideals and way of living which are not very acceptable to Bhojraj and his family. One thing leads to another and one day Meera is declared as an outcast and traitor who failed to play a wife's duties towards her husband, a bride's duties towards her family, and a woman's duties towards society. She is jailed and a public trial is ordered to decide her fate. But Meera is still unshakable and her spirituality keeps her going. She is not even afraid of death. Finally she is given a death sentence and is ordered to drink a cup of venom in front of the public. The love between Meera devi and Lord Krishna is so unshakeable that even the venom does not affect her. She walks out of the royal court after drinking the venom singing Lord Krishna's praises. The entire town follows her, completely absorbed in her kirtan (devotional song). She enters the Krishna temple and becomes one with Lord Krishna.

Cast
Hema Malini as Meera Rathod
Vinod Khanna as Rana Bhojraj Sesodia
Dr. Shreeram Lagoo as Raja Biramdev Rathod
Shammi Kapoor as Raja Vikramjeet Singh Sesodia
Om Shivpuri as Kul Guru (Head Priest)
Dina Pathak as Mrs. Biramdev Rathod a.k.a. 'Kunwarbai'
Vidya Sinha as Krishna Rathod
Amjad Khan as Badshah Akbar
Bharat Bhushan as Tansen
A.K. Hangal as Saint Raidas
Sudha Chopra as Uda Sesodia
Dinesh Thakur as Jaimal Rathod
T P Jain as Poojary (priest)

Production
Film's costume designer Bhanu Athaiya used changing hues of Meera saris to show her spiritual evolution rather dissolving into Krishna. Starting with vibrant colours as a princess, she leave the palace in orange (bhagwa), gradually shifting to yellow, fawn and finally to much paler beige colour.

Soundtrack

Awards and nominations
 1980 Filmfare Award for Best Female Playback Singer - Won - Vani Jairam for "Mere To Giridhar Gopal"

Earlier Versions
In 1945, a film named Meera was made in  Tamil, with M. S. Subbulakshmi in the role of Meera, and music by S V Venkataraman. After the film's huge success it was dubbed in Hindi and released in 1947, with music composed jointly by 3 composers.

References

 Chatterjee, Saibal (2007) - Echoes and Eloquences, The Life and Cinema of Gulzar, Rupa & Co. .
 Gulzar (1979) - Meera: Katha, Montage, Anusandhan aur Patkatha : Gulzar, Radhakrishan Prakashan.

External links

1979 films
1970s Hindi-language films
Films set in the 1580s
Films about Hinduism
Films set in Rajasthan
Films set in the Mughal Empire
Indian biographical films
Films scored by Ravi Shankar
Films with screenplays by Gulzar
Films directed by Gulzar
Cultural depictions of Akbar
Cultural depictions of Tansen
Films set in the Rajput Empire
Krishna in popular culture
Indian epic films
Indian historical films
1970s biographical films
Cultural depictions of Indian monarchs